Roland Chris Yarkpah Massaquoi is a Liberian politician and, as of 2006, leader of the National Patriotic Party (NPP). In 2009, Massaquoi was the President of the Liberian Produce Marketing Corporation.

Running as the NPP presidential candidate in the 11 October 2005 elections, Massaquoi placed sixth out of 22 candidates, receiving 4.1% of the vote. He is a member of the Loma ethnic group.

Massaquoi was agriculture minister and planning minister under the administration of Charles Taylor.

References

Living people
Year of birth missing (living people)
Candidates for President of Liberia
National Patriotic Party politicians
Government ministers of Liberia
21st-century Liberian politicians